Foolish Loving Spaces is the third studio album by English indie pop band Blossoms. It was released on 31 January 2020 by Virgin EMI Records, and again produced by James Skelly and Rich Turvey. The album was supported by the singles "Your Girlfriend", "The Keeper" and "If You Think This Is Real Life". It debuted atop the UK Albums Chart, becoming the band's second UK number-one album, with 18,945 copies sold in its first week in the UK.

Background and recording
Frontman Tom Ogden began writing the album at his parents' house, where he wrote the first two Blossoms albums, as he had started renovating the home he shared with his girlfriend. He resolved to make his room the first room finished in the renovation process so as to write there; after the work was done, he bought an upright piano and wrote 25 songs after being inspired by Talking Heads' Stop Making Sense, U2's The Joshua Tree and Primal Scream's Screamadelica. The initial plan to record the album in Nashville was abandoned in favour of the "more familiar surroundings" of the Parr Street Studios in Liverpool.

Track listing

Personnel
Credits adapted from Foolish Loving Spaces liner notes.

Blossoms
Tom Ogden - vocals, rhythm guitar, piano (track 3)
Charlie Salt - bass guitar, backing vocals , moog bass (track 6)
Josh Dewhurst - lead guitar, lap steel guitar (track 2)
Joe Donovan - drums, percussion
Myles Kellock - keyboards

Additional musicians
Ian Skelly - additional percussion
James Skelly - backing vocals (tracks 1, 2, 4, 7 and 10)
Kim Wedderburne - backing vocals (tracks 1, 3 and 4)
Mica Townsend - backing vocals (tracks 3, 6, 9 and 10)
Yvonne Shelton - backing vocals (tracks 1, 3, 4, 6, 9 and 10)
Zak McDonnell - cymbal (track 1), clapping (track 2)
Kristopher Bradford - clapping (track 2)
Rich Turvey - additional keyboards (tracks 1, 2, 3 and 7), piano (track 8)

Design
Leo Villareal - artwork
Erik Djurklou - photography
Ewan Ogden - photography

Production
James Skelly - production
Rich Turvey - production
Ben Claughan - engineering
Kristopher Bradford - engineering
Joe LaPorta - mastering
Kennie Takahashi - mixing

Charts

Certifications

See also
List of 2020 albums

References

2020 albums
Blossoms (band) albums